In the 2005–06 Egyptian Premier League, Al Ahly were crowned champions for the second year in a row and for the thirty-first time in total since the league started in 1948. As in the previous campaign, they went unbeaten throughout their 26 matches.

Clubs 

 Al Ahly
 Al-Aluminium
 Asmant Asyut
 Asmant Suez
 ENPPI
 Ghazl El-Mehalla
 El Geish
 Haras El Hodood
 Al Ismaili
 Al Itthad Al Sakandary
 El-Masry
 Al Mokawloon
 Koroum
 El Zamalek

Stadiums

League table 

 Top 2 qualify to CAF African Champions League.
 Egyptian Cup winner & 3rd place qualify to CAF Cup.

Top goal scorers 

0
Premier